Saranac Central School District is a school district headquartered in Dannemora, New York.

In 2019 there was an election for a capital project, approved by voters 181–93. It was worth $19.2 million.

The district has a tax levy cap. In June 2020 the budget had a decline in expenditures.

Schools:
 Saranac Central High School
 Saranac Central Middle School
 Morrisonville Elementary School
 Saranac Elementary School

References

External links
 Saranac Central School District
School districts in New York (state)
Education in Clinton County, New York